Léo-Paul Samuel Robert (19 March 1851 - 10 September 1923), also known as Paul Robert, was a Swiss painter, known for his depictions of birds and other wildlife.

Early life 

Paul trained under his father, and then, in 1869, at the Munich Academy of Arts.

After the death of his father in December 1871, he visited Verona, Venice, Ravenna, Bologna and Florence.

Career 

After initially painting allegories, Robert turned his talents next to landscapes, and eventually to watercolours of birds and caterpillars.

His painting  won a gold medal when exhibited at the Paris Salon in 1877.

He illustrated an edition of Jeremias Gotthelf's 1842 book The Black Spider.

From 1891 to 1897 he was a member of the Swiss Federal Commission of Fine Arts and from 1894 to 1918 of the Commission of the Gottfried Keller Foundation.

In 1900 he made a mosaic mural in glass, "The Age of History", also extant, and featuring the figures of Poetry and History, for the facade of the Bern Historical Museum.

Robert was also ordained as a minister in the protestant tradition.

He died on 10 October 1923 in Orvin, Switzerland.

Legacy 

The  houses the 3,000 works of the "Foundation Robert", including hundreds by Paul, and others by the rest of his family.

The street  in Biel/Bienne is named in his honour.

Gallery

Works illustrated

References

Further reading

External links 

 Artists Inspired by Nature – Leo Paul Robert

1851 births
19th-century Swiss painters
19th-century male artists
20th-century Swiss painters
People from Biel/Bienne
Swiss Protestant ministers
Muralists
Academy of Fine Arts, Munich alumni
1923 deaths
20th-century Swiss male artists